Clemente Juan Rodríguez (born 31 July 1981) is an Argentine former professional footballer. He was a right-footed player and could play on either flank, especially as a left back.

Career

Club
Born in Buenos Aires, Rodríguez made his league debut for Boca Juniors in a 2–1 away defeat to Chacarita Juniors on 10 December 2000. He went on to establish himself as an important player in the Boca Juniors team that won a host of national and international tournament in the early 2000s. In 2003, he was part of the Boca team that won the Intercontinental Cup.

In 2004, he signed for Spartak Moscow, but returned to Boca on loan for the 2007 Clausura (spring championship). For the 2007–08 season he joined Spanish side Espanyol on loan.

In August 2009 he returned to Argentina to play for Estudiantes de La Plata. Subsequently, in August 2010, he returned for a third period with Boca Juniors.

On 24 June 2013, São Paulo signed Rodríguez to a two-year contract. On 7 April 2014, after almost one year playing for São Paulo, Rodríguez, along with Fabrício, was removed from the main staff of the club, and sent on loan to Boca Juniors. Rodríguez, who had a contract with the club until June 2015, will therefore no longer play for São Paulo.

Having announced his move to Bolivian club Ciclon de Tárija on 3 September 2020, it was revealed at the end of the same month, that Rodríguez had joined Deportivo Merlo.

International
Rodríguez was part of the gold medal winning Argentine Olympic football team at the 2004 Summer Olympics and has played for the full Argentina national team on an infrequent basis since 2003. He was called by coach Diego Maradona to play in the 2010 FIFA World Cup.

Career statistics

International

Honours

Club
Boca Juniors
 Primera División: 2000 Apertura, 2003 Apertura, 2011 Apertura
 Copa Libertadores: 2001, 2003, 2007
 Intercontinental Cup: 2003
 Copa Argentina: 2011–12

International
Argentina Olympic team
 Summer Olympics Gold Medal: 2004

References

External links
 
 Argentine primera statistics at Futbol XXI  
 Rodriguez, Clemente Juan Historia de Boca.com 
 
 

1981 births
Living people
Footballers from Buenos Aires
Argentine footballers
Argentina international footballers
Argentine expatriate footballers
Boca Juniors footballers
FC Spartak Moscow players
RCD Espanyol footballers
Estudiantes de La Plata footballers
São Paulo FC players
Club Atlético Colón footballers
Deportivo Merlo footballers
Barracas Central players
Club Atlético Ciclón players
Russian Premier League players
La Liga players
Argentine Primera División players
Campeonato Brasileiro Série A players
Association football central defenders
Footballers at the 2004 Summer Olympics
2004 Copa América players
2010 FIFA World Cup players
Olympic footballers of Argentina
Olympic gold medalists for Argentina
Expatriate footballers in Brazil
Expatriate footballers in Russia
Expatriate footballers in Spain
Expatriate footballers in Bolivia
Argentine expatriate sportspeople in Brazil
Argentine expatriate sportspeople in Russia
Argentine expatriate sportspeople in Spain
Argentine expatriate sportspeople in Bolivia
Olympic medalists in football
Medalists at the 2004 Summer Olympics